Bi-level may refer to:
Mullet (haircut)
Bilevel car, double-deck railway carriages
Bi-level image
Bi-level home
Bi-level sync in Video